Anushka Sharma is an Indian actress who appears in Hindi films. Sharma is the recipient of more than 30 awards to her credit. She has won three IIFA Awards and three Star Guild Awards and won the Filmfare Award for Best Supporting Actress for her performance in the 2012 romance Jab Tak Hai Jaan. She has received seven more Filmfare Award nominations, including Best Female Debut for Rab Ne Bana Di Jodi (2008), Best Actress for Rab Ne Bana Di Jodi, Band Baaja Baaraat (2010), NH10 (2015), and Ae Dil Hai Mushkil (2016); Best Supporting Actress for Dil Dhadakne Do (2015), and Best Actress (Critics) for Sui Dhaaga (2018).

Film awards

Other awards and recognitions

Other honors

2009
 Listed in Super Cinema list of Best Debut Actress of the Decade (2000-2009)
 Listed in Femina (India) List of "India's Most Beautiful Woman"

2010
 Listed in Rediff.com list of "Bollywood Best Actors "
 Listed in Femina (India) List of India's "Most Beautiful Woman"

2011
 Listed in The Times of India "Most Desirable Woman"
 Listed in Femina (India) List of India's "Most Beautiful Woman"
 Listed in Times Celebex List of Bollywood Stars
 9th Most Searched Female Actor on Google India

2012
 Debut in India Forbes Celebrity 100
 Listed in Femina (India) List of India's "Most Beautiful Woman"
 Listed in Times Celebex List of Bollywood Stars
 Listed in The Times of India "Most Desirable Woman"

2013
 Listed in Femina (India) List of India's "Most Beautiful Woman"
 Listed in Vogue India List of Best Dressed Celebrities
 Listed in The Times of India "Most Desirable Woman"
 Listed in Times Celebex List of Bollywood Stars
 2nd Most Searched Female Actor on Google India
 Listed in India Forbes Celebrity 100

2014
 Listed in Bollywood Hungama List of Highest Grossing Bollywood Actress
 Listed in Forbes Celebrity 100 India
 Listed in Femina (India) List of India's"Most Beautiful Woman"
 Listed in The Times of India "Most Desirable Woman"
 Listed in Time's Celebex List of Bollywood Stars

2015
 Listed in Rediff.com's List of "Bollywood Best Actors"
 Listed in Huffington Post's List Of Most Influential Woman on Twitter
 Listed in Forbes Celebrity 100 India
 Listed in Times Celebex List of Bollywood Stars
 Listed in The Times of India's "Times Most Desirable Women"
 Listed in Verve (magazine) For Best Dressed Actress
 Listed in IMDb List of "Most Beautiful Woman"
 Listed in Filmfare Magazine Fashion Poll "Amazing with Androgyny"
 Listed in the List of Maxim Hot 100
 Listed in Femina (India) List of India's Most Beautiful Women
 Listed in Bollywood Hungama List of Highest Grossing Bollywood Actress
 Listed in Vogue India List of Best Dressed Celebrities
 Listed in IMDb List of Top 10 Stars Of Indian Cinema

2016
 Listed in IMDb Top 10 Stars Of Indian Cinema
 Listed in Forbes Celebrity 100 India
 Topped Bollywood Hungama's list of Highest Grossing Bollywood Actress
 Listed in Times Celebex List of Bollywood Stars
 Listed in Rediff.com List of "Bollywood Best Actors"
 6th Most Searched Female Actor on Google India
 Listed in Vogue India List of Best Dressed Celebrities
 Listed in Verve (magazine) for Best Dressed Actress
 Listed in The Times of India "Most Engaging" on Twitter
 Listed in IMDb List of "Most Beautiful Woman"
 Listed in The Times of India's "Times Most Desirable Women"
 Listed in the List of Maxim Hot 100 India
 Listed in Femina (India) List of India's Most Beautiful Women

2017
 Listed in Power List Of "Top Actor Producer"
 Listed in IMDb Top 10 Stars Of Indian Cinema
 Grab the Top most Spot in Indias Today Mood Of The Nation Poll As "No 1 Heroine"
 Listed in Femina (India) List of "India's Most Beautiful Women"
 Listed in Times Celebex List of Bollywood Stars
 4th Top most Female Entertainment Handles on Twitter
 Listed in IMDb List of "Most Beautiful Woman"
 Listed in the List of Maxim Hot 100 India
 Listed in Vogue India List of "Best Dressed Celebrities"
 Listed in The Times of India "Most Desirable Woman"
 Listed in India Forbes Celebrity 100

2018
 Listed in Verve (magazine) for "Best Dressed Actress"
 Listed in Maxim Hot 100
 Listed in Bollywood Hungama List of Highest Grossing Bollywood Actress
 Listed in Vogue India List of Best Dressed Celebrities
 Grab the Top most Spot in Times Celebex List of Bollywood Stars
 Listed in IMDb List of "Most Beautiful Woman"
 Grab the Top spot in Indias Today Mood Of The Nation Poll As "No 1 Heroine"
 Listed in Score Trends "Most Influential Star On Social Media"
 Listed in Indias Today Top 50 Power People
 Listed in Femina (India) List of India's Most Beautiful Women
 Listed in t2 Telegraph List OF "Most Promising Gen-Y Actress"
 4th Top most Female Entertainment Handles on Twitter
 Listed in Rediff.com's List of "Bollywood Best Actor"
 Listed in Forbes 30 Under 30 Asia
 Listed in Fortune India's List Of "Most Powerful Woman in Business "
 Listed in India Forbes Celebrity 100

2019
 2nd top most Female Entertainment Handles on Twitter
 Listed in Fortune India's List Of "Most Powerful Woman in Business"
 Listed in bestofthelist.com List of "Most Beautiful Indian Actress"
 Listed in Femina (India) List of "India's Most Beautiful Woman"
 Listed in IMDb "Most Beautiful Woman"
 Ranked No. 2 in India Today Mood Of The Nation Poll As No 1 Heroine
 Ranked 11th in Celebrity Brand Ranking by "Duff & Phelps"
 Listed in India Forbes Celebrity 100

2020
 Listed in Super Cinema List of Top 10 Heroines Of Today
 Listed in Super Cinema List of Highest Grossing Bollywood Actress of the Decade (2010-2019)
 Listed in Ormax Stars India List of "Most Popular Female Stars of the Decade (2010-19)"
 Grab the No. 1 Spot in Score Trend India List of "Most Popular Actress on Twitter 2019"
 Ranked 18th in Celebrity Brand ranking by "Duff & Phelps" in 2019.
 Ranked #2 among actresses in India Today's Mood of the Nation survey for 2019.
 Featured in BW Businessworld List of "Most Influential Woman"
 Listed in Global Woman Powerhouse Producer List of "Most Powerful Woman Producer in the World"
 Ranked #5th in India Today's Mood of the Nation Survey as "India's Most Popular Bollywood Actress" in 2020 
 Ranked #4th in the List of CEO World Magazine Of "Top 10 Richest Bollywood Actress" 
 Ranked 48 in Yahoo India's List of "50 Most Influential People" 
 Listed in Forbes Asia's 100 Digital Star 
 Listed in Fortune India List Of "Most Powerful Woman in Business"
 Ranked #25 in the Global List of "100 Instagram Influencers"
 Ranked #45 in the Eastern Eye List of "Top 50 Asian Celebrities"
 Ranked 5th in India Today "Mood of the Nation Poll" A No 1 Heroine.
 Ranked 13 in the List of "Wizikey Rank and Score"

References

External links
 

Sharma, Anushka